The 1972 Cal Poly Pomona Broncos football team represented California State Polytechnic University, Pomona as a member of the California Collegiate Athletic Association (CCAA) during the 1972 NCAA College Division football season. Led by fourth-year head coach Roy Anderson, Cal Poly Pomona compiled an overall record of 4–6 with a mark of 0–4 in conference play, placing last out of five teams in the CCAA. The team was outscored by its opponents 230 to 222 for the season. The Broncos played home games at Kellogg Field in Pomona, California.

Schedule

References

Cal Poly Pomona
Cal Poly Pomona Broncos football seasons
Cal Poly Pomona Broncos football